Bernard Francisco Ribeiro, Baron Ribeiro,  (born 20 January 1944) is a British surgeon who served as President of the Royal College of Surgeons of England from 2005 to 2008. He was created a life peer in 2010 and sits in the House of Lords on the Conservative benches.

Biography
Born in 1944 in Achimota in the Gold Coast (now Ghana), Bernard Ribeiro was educated at Dean Close School, Cheltenham, Gloucestershire, and at Middlesex Hospital Medical School.

Ribeiro qualified as a doctor at Middlesex Medical School in 1967 and then specialised in surgery, five years later being awarded Fellowship of the Royal College of Surgeons (FRCS). From 1979 until his retirement in April 2008, he was consultant general surgeon at Basildon Hospital with a special interest in urology and colorectal surgery, pioneering the use of invasive keyhole surgery, and helping to establish the Basildon and Thurrock University Hospitals NHS Foundation Trust's advanced laparoscopic unit. He was elected to the Council of the Royal College of Surgeons of England in 1998. In 2008 he was awarded the Honorary degree of Doctor of Science by Anglia Ruskin University. Also in 2008 he received an Honorary Fellowship from the American College of Surgeons.

In the 2004 New Year Honours he was appointed a Commander of the Order of the British Empire (CBE) for services to medicine, and was appointed Knight Bachelor in the 2009 New Year Honours. He was created a life peer on 20 December 2010, as Baron Ribeiro, of Achimota in the Republic of Ghana and of Ovington in the County of Hampshire.

In 2012, Lord Ribeiro was confirmed as Chair of the Department of Health's Independent Reconfiguration Panel, advising the Secretary of State for Health on changes to local health services in England. He serves as Master of the Worshipful Company of Barbers for 2013–14.  He is President of the Council of Dean Close School.

Lord Ribeiro is an active Freemason and currently serves the United Grand Lodge of England as the Right Worshipful Senior Grand Warden. He was previously the Senior Grand Deacon in 2005, and Junior Grand Warden in 2018.

In November 2020 he was appointed to the board of the Equality and Human Rights Commission,  and was appointed Chancellor of Anglia Ruskin University on January 1, 2021.

Family 
Bernard Ribeiro's immediate family is made up of has wife, Elisabeth, and four children, Joanna Charlotte, Tessa Elisabeth, Nicola Helen, and Richard Francisco Ribeiro.

Medical work 
In 2014, there was an Assisted Dying Bill that was proposed by Lord Falconer. This bill aimed to make it legal for doctors to provide patients medication that would end their life if they chose. Bernard Ribeiro was not in favor of this bill, believing that it would complicate patient-doctor relationships.

In 2007 Bernard Ribeiro responded to two of his colleagues Maynard and Ayalew, and detailing how establishments such as Royal College of Surgeons of England are working to implement patient reported outcome measures for elective surgical procedures. Ribeiro believed that the entire National Health Service and its patients would benefit. This implementation would also lead to higher levels of training and teaching standards.

Bernard Ribeiro began his career at Basildon Hospital when he was appointed there in 1979. In addition to his development of many surgery techniques, such as minimally invasive surgery, he was also instrumental in bringing the construction of the Essex Cardiothoracic Centre to the Basildon Hospital.  The Essex Cardiothoracic Centre at Basildon Hospital routinely sees 300,000 outpatients in addition to seeing 103,000 accident and emergency patients.

Awards and honors 
Bernard Ribeiro was awarded the Fellowship of the Royal College of Surgeons in 1972. He was then awarded the role of Consultant General Surgeon in 1979 at Basildon Hospital. From 1999 until 2000 Bernard Ribeiro was President of the Association of Surgeons across Great Britain as well as Ireland. From 2005 to 2008 he was President of the Royal College of Surgeons. Bernard Ribeiro received the CBE award in 2004, for making outstanding contributions towards medicine. In 2012, Ribeiro was appointed Chairman of the Independent Recognition Panel, whose responsibility was to advise the Secretary of State for Health. Ribeiro was also added as a member of the European Union's Home Affairs Sub-Committee in the House of Lords. He was also tasked as a committee member for the Select Committee on the Long-Term Sustainability of the NHS and Adult Social Care. Bernard Ribeiro is best known for his development and execution of keyhole surgery. It was for this achievement that helped Bernard Ribeiro become acknowledged and inducted into the House of Lords. He also holds honorary degrees from multiple universities—such as the University of Bath and Anglia Ruskin University—as well as an honorary fellowship with the American College of Surgeons.

References

External links
 "Mr Bernard Ribeiro’s GDDA Inaugural Speech", 9 September 2006.

1944 births
English surgeons
Commanders of the Order of the British Empire
Conservative Party (UK) life peers
Fellows of the Royal College of Surgeons
Alumni of the UCL Medical School
Living people
Knights Bachelor
Place of birth missing (living people)
People from the City of Winchester
Ghanaian emigrants to England
Black British politicians
People educated at Dean Close School
Black British people in health professions
Ghanaian surgeons
Life peers created by Elizabeth II